William "Will" Skelton (born 3 May 1992) is an Australian rugby union player, who plays as a lock for La Rochelle in the French Top 14 competition. 

Skelton was born in New Zealand, and he is of Samoan descent; he moved to Australia as a child and qualified for Australia through residency. He won 19 caps for Australia since 2014 and played at the 2015 Rugby World Cup.

Family and early life
Skelton was born in Auckland, New Zealand, and moved with his family to Sydney at the age of 10. He is the older brother of Cameron Skelton and is a cousin of former New Zealand lock Brad Mika. Though smaller than his younger brother, Skelton weighed 150 kg while still a teenager and he wears size 18 to 19 (UK) boots.

He played junior rugby league for the Wentworthville Magpies before taking up rugby union at age 15 at The Hills Sports High School in Seven Hills.

Skelton joined the Sydney University rugby club in 2010. In 2011, he was invited into the Waratahs Academy and the ARU's National Academy in Sydney. After a promising first year, a fractured foot sustained in February 2012 prevented him from playing for the remainder of the year.

Rugby career

Waratahs
In March 2013, Skelton was signed to the Waratahs' Extended Player Squad by coach Michael Cheika. He made his Super Rugby debut against the Stormers, and was selected to play for the Waratahs against the British and Irish Lions in June of that year.

In 2014, Skelton was approached by Graham Henry to join the Blues in Auckland, but turned him down. He was named in the Australia squad for the June tests in 2014.

Skelton made his test debut for Australia against France on 21 June 2014, starting as the right lock and scoring the first try for the Wallabies in their 39–13 win. His offload game has been compared to Sonny Bill Williams'.

The Waratahs made the Super Rugby semi-finals in 2015. Skelton was included in the Australia squad for the Rugby Championship and he started against the Springboks in the 24-20 win at Suncorp Stadium.

Skelton's inclusion in the Wallabies squad for the 2015 Rugby World Cup was cut short after he sustained a shoulder injury during the tournament.

Saracens
On 4 April 2017 it was announced that Skelton was to join Saracens on a 2-year deal beginning in the 2017/18 season following a successful run of 8 games whilst on a short-term loan earlier in the season. As of September 2018 Skelton had lost 21 kg weight since joining Saracens, bringing his weight to 125–130 kg. During his time at Saracens he has won two Premiership titles in 2018 and 2019. He also helped Saracens win the European Champions Cup in 2019.

La Rochelle
He signed for French club La Rochelle ahead of the 2020–21 season. Skelton was called up to play for the Wallabies again for the 2021 end-of-year rugby union internationals, alongside former teammates Kurtley Beale, Tolu Latu and Rory Arnold. On 22 June 2021, he extended his contract with the French side until 2025. 

On 28 May 2022, he led La Rochelle to an epic 21-24 win against Leinster in the 2022 European Rugby Champions Cup Final at Stade Vélodrome in Marseille, being one of the best players on the field and earning his third European Rugby Champions Cup trophy.

Honours

Waratahs
 Super Rugby: 2014

Saracens
 European Rugby Champions Cup: 2016-17, 2018-19
 Premiership: 2017-18, 2018-19

La Rochelle
 European Rugby Champions Cup: 2021-22

Australia
 The Rugby Championship: 2015

References

External links
 It's Rugby statistics
 Waratahs Profile
 

1992 births
Australia international rugby union players
Australian sportspeople of Samoan descent
Australian people of New Zealand descent
Australian rugby union players
New South Wales Waratahs players
Living people
Rugby union players from Auckland
New Zealand emigrants to Australia
Rugby union locks
Sydney Stars players